The Dark Side of the Moon is a 1986 Danish drama film directed by Erik Clausen. The film was selected as the Danish entry for the Best Foreign Language Film at the 59th Academy Awards, but was not accepted as a nominee.

Cast
 Christina Bengtsson as Christina
 Mogens Eckert
 Stig Hoffmeyer as Tjener
 Kim Jansson
 Catherine Poul Jupont as Maria Bianca
 Marianne Mortensen as Luder (hooker)
 Anne Nøjgaard as Luder (hooker)
 Berthe Qvistgaard as Johannes mor
 Roy Richards as Afrikansk gæstearbejder
 Peter Thiel as Johannes
 Erik Truxa as Politiassistent
 Yavuzer Çetinkaya as Tyrkisk gæstearbejder

See also
 List of submissions to the 59th Academy Awards for Best Foreign Language Film
 List of Danish submissions for the Academy Award for Best Foreign Language Film

References

External links
 

1986 drama films
1986 films
Danish drama films
1980s Danish-language films
Films directed by Erik Clausen